Mississauga West was a federal electoral district represented in the House of Commons of Canada from 1988 to 2003. It was located in the city of Mississauga in the province of Ontario. This riding was created in 1987 from Mississauga North riding.

Mississauga West consisted of the part of the City of Mississauga lying of north of Dundas Street West west of the Credit River, north of the Queen Elizabeth Way, and west of Hurontario Street. It was re-defined in 1996.

The electoral district was abolished in 2003 when it was re-distributed between Mississauga South, Mississauga—Erindale and Mississauga—Streetsville ridings.

Members of Parliament

Electoral history

|- 
  
|Progressive Conservative
|Robert Horner 
|align="right"|32,992

 
|New Democratic
|Paul Simon 
|align="right"|6,621
  
|Libertarian
|C. Garnet Brace 
|align="right"|459

|-

  
|Progressive Conservative
|Robert Horner 
|align="right"|27,789 
  
|Reform
|Charles Conn
|align="right"|19,838   
 
|New Democratic
|Paul Simon 
|align="right"| 2,195 

  
|Natural Law
|Michael Beifuss 
|align="right"|476 
  
|Marxist–Leninist
|Gurdev Singh 
|align="right"|127 
  
|Abolitionist
|Dwayne Foster
|align="right"|78

|-

  
|Reform
|George Brant
|align="right"|9,160    
  
|Progressive Conservative
| Rami Gill 
|align="right"| 8,102 
 
|New Democratic
|Timothy Dean Speck
|align="right"| 2,128

|-
  
|Liberal
| Steve Mahoney
|align="right"|31,260 

|Canadian Alliance
|Philip Leong 
|align="right"|10,582 
  
|Progressive Conservative
|Gul Nawaz 
|align="right"|5,275 
 
|New Democratic
|Cynthia Kazadi
|align="right"|1,532

See also 

 List of Canadian federal electoral districts
 Past Canadian electoral districts

External links 

 Website of the Parliament of Canada

Former federal electoral districts of Ontario
Politics of Mississauga